Iraq competed at the 1992 Summer Olympics in Barcelona, Spain.

Competitors
The following is the list of number of competitors in the Games.

References

Official Olympic Reports

Nations at the 1992 Summer Olympics
1992
1992 in Iraqi sport